Franz Ullrich (1830–1891) was a German industrialist, and co-founder of the "Gebrüder Ullrich" in the Rhineland-Palatinate.

Life
Franz Ullrich was born on the 22 July 1830 in the small town of Maikammer, Germany.  He was the youngest son of an international merchant, Leonhard Ullrich, and his wife Regina Damm. After studying banking in Neustadt an der Weinstrasse for four years, he founded a company with his older brother, Anton, called the "Gebrüder Ullrich".  Together they built up an enameling factory in Maikammer.  In 1855 the two Ullrich brothers purchased machinery from the Exposition Universelle in Paris to be used in the factory.  On the 17 November 1857, Franz Ullrich married Eva Katharina Schmitt in Maikammer.  

The "Gebrüder Ullrich" company expanded quickly and would later establish sites in neighbouring towns.  Having exhausted the local supply of labour and raw materials, Franz Ullrich and his son's Gustav and August searched for an appropriate site for another factory.  By 1889, Gustav Ullrich had already established a factory manufacturing measuring equipment, later known as "Stabila",in Annweiler am Trifels, a town close to the French border.  It was eventually decided that the additional enamel factory would also be built in Annweiler.  In 1890 the "Gebrüder Ullrich" company split into two companies, forming "Franz Ullrich Söhne" and "Emaillir- & Stanzwerke vormals Gebrüder Ullrich".  Franz Ullrich and his sons, Gustav and August, moved to Annweiler to oversee the operations of the new company, "Franz Ullrich Söhne".  Anton Ullrich and his son remained in Maikammer to continue the management of "Emaillir- & Stanzwerke vormals Gebrüder Ullrich".  The oldest son of Franz Ullrich, Eugen, also remained in Maikammer to continue running Franz Ullrich's family winery. Franz Ullrich continued to live in Annweiler am Trifels until his death on the 21 December 1891.

Factory sites

 Annweiler am Trifels, Germany
 Bellheim, Germany
 Châlons-en-Champagne, France
 Kirrweiler, Germany
 Maikammer, Germany
 Schifferstadt, Germany

Awards

 1893 Gold Medal – Kaiserslautern
 1895 Gold Medal – Landau
 1895 Medal – Strassbourg
 1895 Gold Medal – Ulm
 1896 Gold Medal – Nuremberg

External links

History of Stabila Brief history of the Stabila Company

References

Publications

1830 births
1891 deaths
19th-century German businesspeople
German enamellers
19th-century enamellers